The 1986 season of the African Cup Winners' Cup football club tournament was won by Al Ahly in two-legged final victory against AS Sogara. This was the twelfth season that the tournament took place for the winners of each African country's domestic cup. Thirty-eight sides entered the competition, with AS Police withdrawing before the 1st leg of the preliminary round.

Preliminary round

|}

First round

|}

1: 1st leg was abandoned and both teams were disqualified; Dragons for fielding two ineligible players, Abiola for the pitch invasion by its supporters.

Second round

|}

1: Al-Ahli SC (Tripoli) was disqualified before 1st leg after the Libyan FF had been suspended by CAF for not paying its subscription dues.
2: AS Sogara were to play against the winners of Dragons de l'Ouémé vs Abiola Babes (both disqualified).

Quarterfinals

|}

Semifinals

|}

Final

|}

Champions

External links
 Results available on CAF Official Website
 Results available on RSSSF

African Cup Winners' Cup
2